A snap fastener, also called snap button, press stud, press fastener, dome fastener, popper, snap and tich (or tich button), is a pair of interlocking discs, made out of a metal or plastic, commonly used in place of traditional buttons to fasten clothing and for similar purposes.  A circular lip under one disc fits into a groove on the top of the other, holding them fast until a certain amount of force is applied. Different types of snaps can be attached to fabric or leather by riveting with a punch and die set specific to the type of rivet snaps used (striking the punch with a hammer to splay the tail), sewing, or plying with special snap pliers.

Snap fasteners are a noted detail in American Western wear and are also often chosen for children's clothing, as they are relatively easy for children to use compared with traditional buttons.

Invention

Modern snap fasteners were patented by German inventor Heribert Bauer in 1885 as the "Federknopf-Verschluss", a novelty fastener for men's trousers.  Some attribute the invention to Bertel Sanders, of Denmark. In 1886, Albert-Pierre Raymond, of Grenoble, also obtained a patent. These first versions had an S-shaped spring in the "male" disc instead of a groove. Australian inventor Myra Juliet Farrell is also credited with inventing a "stitchless press stud" and the "stitchless hook and eye". In America, Jack Weil (1901–2008) put snaps on his iconic Western shirts, which spread the fashion for them. The Prym company has produced snap fasteners since 1903.

Use

Snaps were incorporated into military gear for their speed of use, comparative freedom from snaring, and ease of disentanglement when caught; they were particularly adapted to paratroop equipment due to the danger of snares in the myriad lines attaching a parachute canopy.

They were also adopted for use with law enforcement holsters and their myriad accessories for similar reasons – replaced in both fields largely by Velcro in recent decades.
 
Press studs were adopted by rodeo cowboys from the 1930s onwards, because these could be quickly undone if, in the event of a fall, the shirt became snagged in the saddle. Faux pearl snaps entered American mainstream Western fashion during the 1950s, when singing cowboys like Gene Autry and Roy Rogers incorporated them into their embroidered and fringed stage shirts.

Gallery

References

External links

1940s fashion
20th-century fashion
German inventions
Textile closures
Western wear

de:Knopf#Druckknopf